Sakshal Sreeman Chathunni is a 1993 Indian Malayalam-language comedy fantasy drama film directed by Anil–Babu and written by Kaloor Dennis, starring Innocent, Jagadish and Baiju.

Plot

The plot follows two friends Unnikrishnan and Dasan accidentally meeting a genie named Chathunni and the adventures involving the trio and the problems occurring around them.

Cast
 Innocent as Chathunni
 Jagadish as Unnikrishnan
 Baiju as Dasan
 Jagathy Sreekumar as Pathalam Bhairavan
 Maathu as Maya Rajagopal
 K. P. A. C. Lalitha as Pankajam
 Sukumari as Bhavani
 Shammi Thilakan as Vikraman
 K. P. A. C. Sunny as Rajagopal
 P. C. George as Keshava Panicker
 Krishnankutty Nair as Sankunni Nair
 Kundara Johny as Bhargavan
 Zainuddin as Gopalan
 M. S. Thripunithura as Parameswaran Nair
 Kalpana as Reshmi Nair
 Harisree Ashokan as Bhaskaran
 Paravoor Bharathan as House Owner
 T. P. Madhavan as Blade Kaimal
 Kunchan as Raoji	
 N. Govindankutty as Manthravadi
 Narayanankutty as Thief
 Bobby Kottarakkara as Constable
 Rashid as Gabbar Singh
 Kavitha Thambi as Unni's Sister
 Silk Smitha as Herself (Special appearance in song)
 Shilpa Punnoose

Soundtrack
The songs were penned by Bichu Thirumala and the music was composed by Rajamani

References

External links
 

1993 films
1990s Malayalam-language films